Piney Township may refer to the following townships in the United States:

 Piney Township, Carroll County, Arkansas
 Piney Township, Oregon County, Missouri
 Piney Township, Clarion County, Pennsylvania

See also 
 Piney Creek Township, Alleghany County, North Carolina